The Cello Concerto No. 1 in E-flat major, Op. 107, was composed in 1959 by Dmitri Shostakovich. Shostakovich wrote the work for his friend Mstislav Rostropovich, who committed it to memory in four days. He premiered it on October 4, 1959, at the Large Hall of the Leningrad Conservatory with the Leningrad Philharmonic Orchestra conducted by Yevgeny Mravinsky. The first recording was made in two days following the premiere by Rostropovich and the Moscow Philharmonic Orchestra conducted by Aleksandr Gauk.

Scoring and structure

The concerto is scored for solo cello, two flutes (2nd doubling piccolo), two oboes, two clarinets (each doubling B and A), two bassoons (2nd doubling contrabassoon), one horn, timpani, celesta, and strings.

The work has four movements in two sections, with movements two through four played without a pause:

A typical performance runs approximately 28 minutes in length.

Analysis

The first concerto is widely considered to be one of the most difficult concert works for cello, along with the Sinfonia Concertante of Sergei Prokofiev, with which it shares certain features (such as the prominent role of isolated timpani strokes). Shostakovich said that "an impulse" for the piece was provided by his admiration for that earlier work.
 
The first movement begins with a four-note main motive some believe is derived from the composer's musical cryptogram D-S-C-H for his name DSCH. The concerto motive is only remotely related, specifically by both being four-note motives having a half-step between the third and fourth notes. The intervals, rhythm and shape of the motto are continually distorted and re-shaped throughout the movement. It is also related to a theme from the composer's score for the 1948 film The Young Guard, which illustrates a group of Soviet soldiers being marched to their deaths at the hands of the Nazis. The theme reappears in Shostakovich's String Quartet No. 8 (1960).

The theme is simplified even further in the woodwind, which reappears throughout the work:

The opening motive recurs throughout the concerto (except in the second movement), giving this concerto a cyclic structure.

The second, third and fourth movements are played continuously. The second movement is initially elegiac in tone. The string section begins with a quiet theme that is never played by the solo cello. The horn answers and the solo cello begins a new theme. The orchestra plays it after and the first theme is played again. The cello plays its second theme, which progressively becomes more agitated, building to a climax in bar 148. This is immediately followed by the first theme played loudly. The solo cello plays its first melody in artificial harmonics with answers by the celesta, which leads into the cadenza. The second movement is the only movement with no reference to the opening motive of the first movement.

The cadenza stands as a movement in itself. It begins by developing the material from the cello's second theme of the second movement, twice broken by a series of slow pizzicato chords. After the second time this is repeated, the cello's first theme of the second movement is played in an altered form. After the third time the chords are repeated, a continual accelerando passes through allegretto and allegro sections to a piu mosso section. These sections are frequented by the first movement motive. The piu mosso section features fast ascending and descending scales.

The final movement begins with an ascent to a high D. The oboe begins the main theme, which is based on the chromatic scale. The cello repeats it, then presents a new theme. The cellos of the orchestra repeat this, accompanied by the solo cello playing fast sixteenth notes. At bar 105, a distorted version of Suliko, a song favoured by Stalin and used by Shostakovich in Rayok, his satire on the Soviet system, is played. Then, the flutes play the first theme again. A new theme played in triple time is presented by the orchestra, which is repeated by the cello. Then, the orchestra repeats and alters the theme. The horn, bass instruments and solo cello follow. The bass instruments play a modified version of the theme, which is repeated by the solo cello after. The cello begins playing a new theme that uses exactly the same notes as the opening motif. The modified version that was just played by bass instruments is repeated by the solo cello, accompanied by oboes playing fragments of the new opening motive. The first theme of this movement is played by the string section after, followed by the new opening motive theme in the woodwinds. The opening theme of the first movement is played, answered by the cello. After the third time this is played, the horn plays the theme again in longer notes. Then, the cello plays a passage from the first movement, which is followed by the first theme of this movement played by the woodwinds. This is followed by the first theme of the first movement played by the cellos of the orchestra, accompanied by scales in the solo cello. Then, a modified form of the first theme of this movement is played in the cello. The concerto ends with seven timpani strokes.

Recordings

Recordings of this work include the following:
Han-Na Chang/London Symphony Orchestra/Antonio Pappano (EMI Classics)
Heinrich Schiff/Bavarian Radio Symphony Orchestra/Maxim Shostakovich (Philips)
 Heinrich Schiff/Vienna Philharmonic Orchestra/Christoph von Dohnányi (Fachmann für Klassischer Musik) 	
Daniel Müller-Schott/Bavarian Radio Symphony/Yakov Kreizberg (Orfeo)
Johannes Moser/Cologne West German Radio Symphony Orchestra (WDR Sinfonieorchester Köln)/Pietari Inkinen (Hanssler Classic)
Natalia Gutman/USSR Radio & TV Symphony Orchestra/(Kyril or Kirill) Kyrill Kondrashin (Live Classics) Recorded 21 June 1976
Natalia Gutman/Royal Philharmonic Orchestra/Yuri Temirkanov (RCA/BMG) Recorded 1988
Zuill Bailey/San Francisco Ballet Orchestra/Martin West (Telarc)
Truls Mørk/London Philharmonic Orchestra/Mariss Jansons (Virgin Classics)
Mischa Maisky/London Symphony Orchestra/Michael Tilson Thomas (Deutsche Grammophon)
Yo Yo Ma/Philadelphia Orchestra/Eugene Ormandy (Sony)
/Danish National Symphony Orchestra/Gianandrea Noseda (Chandos)
Pieter Wispelwey//Jurgen Hempel (Channel Classics)
Lynn Harrell/Seattle Symphony/Gerard Schwarz (Artek)
Ivan Monighetti/Prague Radio Symphony Orchestra/Vladimir Valek (Le Chant du Monde) 
Rafał Kwiatkowski/Polish Radio Orchestra/Wojciech Rajski (Dux)
Frans Helmerson/Russian State Symphony Orchestra/Valery Polyansky (Chandos)
Kyril Rodin/Russian Philharmonic Orchestra/Konstantin Krimets (Arte Nova Classics)
Viviane Spanoghe/Sofia Soloists Symphony Orchestra/Emil Tabakov (Talent) 
/Malmö Symphony Orchestra/James DePreist (BIS)
Maria Kliegel/Polish National Radio Symphony Orchestra/Antoni Wit (Naxos Records)
Dimitri Maslennikov/NDR Symphony Orchestra/Christoph Eschenbach (Phoenix Edition)
Kim Cook/Volgograd Symphony Orchestra/Edward Serov (MSR Classics)
Raphael Wallfisch/BBC Symphony Orchestra/Martyn Brabbins (Nimbus)
Mstislav Rostropovich/Philadelphia Orchestra/Eugene Ormandy (Sony Classical) world-premier recording
Mstislav Rostropovich/Leningrad Philharmonic Orchestra/Gennady Rozhdestvensky (BBC Legends) live recording
Mstislav Rostropovich/Moscow Philharmonic Orchestra/Kyrill Kondrashin (Intaglio) poor audio quality
Janos Starker/Swiss-Italian Radio & TV Orchestra - Orchestra della Radiotelevisione della Svizzera Italiana/Marc Andreae (Ermitage)
Vladimir Orloff/Orchestre Philharmonique de l'O.R.T.F., Paris/ Jean Périsson (Doremi) broadcast recording
Alexander Baillie/Boston Philharmonic Orchestra/Benjamin Zander (Carlton Classics)	
Jiří Bárta/Prague Symphony Orchestra/Maxim Shostakovich (Supraphon)	
Valentin Feigin/USSR TV and Radio Symphony Orchestra/Maxim Shostakovich (Melodiya)
William De Rosa/Ekaterinburg Philharmonic Orchestra/Sarah Caldwell (Audiofon)	 	
Mark Drobinsky/Kazan Symphony Orchestra/Fuat Mansurov (Talent)	
Mikhail Khomitser/USSR Radio Symphony Orchestra/Gennady Rozhdestvensky (RCA)
Carlos Prieto/Orquestra Sinfonica de Xalapa/Luis Herrera de la Fuente (IMP Classics)
Nathaniel Rosen/Sofia Philharmonic Orchestra/Emil Tabakov (John Marks Records) 
(Natalya) Natalia Shakhovskaya/Moscow Radio Symphony Orchestra/Gennady Rozhdestvensky (BBC)	
Sonia Wieder-Atherton//Sinfonia Varsovia/János Fürst (RCA)
Pierre Fournier/Suisse Romande Orchestra/Jascha Horenstein (Cascavelle)
Miloš Sádlo/Czech Philharmonic Orchestra/Karel Ančerl (Supraphon)
Paul Tortelier/Bournemouth Symphony Orchestra/Paavo Berglund (EMI)
Daniel Shafran/Moscow Philharmonic Orchestra/Konstantin Ivanov (Regis Reissue) 
Pierre Strauch/Le Sinfonietta Orchestre Régional de Picardie/Alexandre Myrat (Harmonia Mundi)	
Alexander Ivashkin/Moscow Symphony Orchestra/Valeri Polyansky (Brilliant Classics)
Claudio Bohórquez/Staatliches Symphony Orchestra Kaliningrad-Konigsberg/Arkadi Feldmann (Antes Edition / Bella Musica)
Gavriel Lipkind/Sinfonia Varsovia/Wojciech Rodek (Lipkind Productions) Download only
Jan Vogler/Jan Vogler and The Knights Experience (ensemble) (Sony Classical) an unconventional rendition
Nicolas Altstaedt / Deutsches Symphonie-Orchester Berlin (Channel Classics Recordings, 2016)
Gautier Capuçon / Valery Gergiev / Mariinsky Orchestra (Erato, 2015)
Sheku Kanneh-Mason/City of Birmingham Symphony Orchestra/Mirga Gražinytė-Tyla (Decca)
Marc Coppey/Polish National Radio Symphony Orchestra/Lawrence Foster (Audite, 2021)

References
Notes

Sources
Johnson, Stephen (18 March 2006). Discovering Music: Shostakovich - Cello Concerto No 1 on BBC Radio 3.
Shostakovich, Dmitri (1959, reprinted 1986). Cello Concertos (volume 17 of collected works). State Publishers 'Music', Moscow.

External links
 Dmitry Shostakovich Cello Concerto No. 1, program notes by Barbara Heninger for the Redwood Symphony.
Listening guide based on Heinrich Schiff's recording with the Bavarian Radio Symphony Orchestra.

Concertos by Dmitri Shostakovich
Shostakovich Cello Concerto No. 1
1959 compositions
Compositions in E-flat major